Four ships operated by the Confederate States of America were named Beauregard, after P. G. T. Beauregard, a Confederate States Army general.

 , a Confederate steamer captured by the Union Navy while with a bomb boat.
 , an army steamer, captured by United States Army forces.
 , a privateer two-masted brig schooner, captured.
 , a army schooner, burned to prevent capture.

See also 

 , confederate cottonclad warship.
 Confederate States Navy

Ship names